The Samuel Weston Homestead is a historic house on United States Route 201 in Skowhegan, Maine.  Built 1798–1800, it is a high-quality example of transitional Georgian-Federal period architecture, and is notable for its historical association with Samuel Weston, an early resident and land surveyor of the region.  The house was listed on the National Register of Historic Places in 1980.

Description and history
The Weston Homestead is set on the southwest side of a rural stretch of US 201, southeast of Skowhegan center.  It is a -story wood-frame structure with an L shape, presenting facades to the northeast and southeast.  The northeast-facing facade is the primary, six bays wide, with the main entrance in the third bay from the left, sheltered by a portico with Doric columns, and a minor secondary entrance sandwiched to the left of the rightmost window.  The fenestration is irregularly arranged.  The secondary facade is five bays wide, with a centered entrance flanked by pilasters and topped by a gabled pediment.  The house's interior is a well-preserved blend of Georgian and Federal period styling.

The house was built between 1798 and 1800 by Samuel Weston, whose father Joseph settled Canaan (as Skowhegan was first called) in 1772. The younger Weston was a leading citizen of the area in his time, serving as a justice of the peace and as the town's first postmaster.

See also
National Register of Historic Places listings in Somerset County, Maine

References

External links

Houses on the National Register of Historic Places in Maine
Georgian architecture in Maine
Federal architecture in Maine
Houses completed in 1798
Houses in Somerset County, Maine
Buildings and structures in Skowhegan, Maine
National Register of Historic Places in Somerset County, Maine